The Tollund Man (died  405–380 BC) is a naturally mummified corpse of a man who lived during the 5th century BC, during the period characterised in Scandinavia as the Pre-Roman Iron Age. He was found in 1950, preserved as a bog body, near Silkeborg on the Jutland peninsula in Denmark. The man's physical features were so well preserved that he was mistaken for a recent murder victim. Twelve years before his discovery, another bog body, Elling Woman, was found in the same bog.

The cause of death has been determined to be by hanging. Scholars believe the man was a human sacrifice, rather than an executed criminal, because of the arranged position of his body, and his eyes and mouth being closed.

Discovery

He wore a pointed skin cap of sheepskin and wool, fastened under his chin by a hide thong, and a smooth hide belt around his waist. Additionally, a noose made of plaited animal hide was drawn tight around his neck and trailed down his back. Other than these, the body was naked. His hair was cropped so short as to be almost entirely hidden by his cap. There was short stubble ( in length) on his chin and upper lip, suggesting that he was usually clean-shaven, but had not shaved on the day of his death. The Tollund Man was approximately 40 years old. The Tollund Man's last meal consisted of a porridge with barley, flax, wild weed seeds, and some fish.

Scientific examination and conclusions

Radiocarbon dating of Tollund Man indicated that he died circa 405–380 BC. The preserved tender soft tissues of his body are the consequence of the acid in the peat, along with the lack of oxygen underneath the surface and the cold climate of the Nordic countries. The acid in the peat, needed for the preservation of a human body, is caused by a bryophyte named Sphagnum. Sphagnum fights against degradation due to resistant phenolic compounds contained in their cell walls. Due to the acidity of peat, bones are typically dissolved rather than preserved.

Scientists conducted an isotope analysis of the element strontium to measure the quantities down to the minute to get an accurate idea of where he may have traveled before his death. They took samples from his femur and hair to compare. They were only able to measure up to a year because of his hairs being short. The results contained only small differences in strontium isotope proportions, suggesting that he spent his final year in Denmark, and that he may have moved at least  in his last six months.

Examinations and X-rays showed that the man's head was undamaged, and his heart, lungs and liver were well preserved. It is likely that the body had shrunk in the bog.

On the initial autopsy report in 1950, doctors concluded that Tollund Man died by hanging rather than strangulation. The rope left visible furrows in the skin beneath his chin and at the sides of his neck. There was no mark, however, at the back of the neck where the knot of the noose would have been located. After a re-examination in 2002, forensic scientists found further evidence to support these initial findings. Although the cervical vertebrae were undamaged (these vertebrae are often damaged as a result of hanging), radiography showed that the tongue was distended—an indication of death by hanging.

The stomach and intestines were examined and tests carried out on their contents. Scientists identified the man's last meal as porridge or gruel made from grains and seeds, both cultivated and wild. Approximately 40 kinds of seeds were identified, but the porridge was primarily composed of four types: barley, flax, false flax (Camelina sativa), and knotgrass. From the stage of digestion it was concluded that the man had eaten 12 to 24 hours prior to his death. Porridges were common for people of this time. Because neither meat nor fresh fruit was found in the last meal, it is suggested that the meal was eaten in winter or early spring, when these items were not available.

Both feet and the right thumb, being well conserved by the peat, were also preserved in formalin for later examination. In 1976, the Danish police made a fingerprint analysis, making Tollund Man's thumbprint one of the oldest prints on record.

Display

The body is displayed at the Silkeborg Museum in Denmark, although only the head is original. Because conservation techniques for organic material were insufficiently advanced in the early 1950s for the entire body to be preserved, the forensic examiners suggested the head be severed and the rest of the body remain unpreserved. Subsequently, the body was desiccated and the tissue disappeared. In 1987, the Silkeborg Museum reconstructed the body using the skeletal remains as a base. As displayed today, the original head is attached to a replica of the body.

Other bodies

In Denmark, more than 500 bog bodies and skeletal remains dating to the Iron Age have been recovered. Specimens from Jutland include the relatively well-preserved Borremose bodies, Huldremose Woman, Grauballe Man on display at Moesgaard Museum near Aarhus, and the similarly conserved Haraldskær Woman. Approximately 30 of these bog bodies are housed and/or displayed in Danish museums for continued research.

In popular culture
Nobel Prize–winning Irish poet Seamus Heaney wrote a series of poems inspired by P. V. Glob's study of the mummified Iron Age bodies found in Jutland's peat bogs, finding contemporary political relevance in the relics of the ritualistic killings. Heaney's poem "The Tollund Man", published in his Wintering Out collection, compares the ritual sacrifice to those who died in the sectarian violence of "the Troubles". Heaney wrote an excerpt from the poem in the Tollund Man exhibit's guest book in 1973.

British author Margaret Drabble, in her 1989 novel A Natural Curiosity, uses her characters' obsession with the Tollund Man to provide a satirical criticism of Margaret Thatcher's modern England.

Tollund Man is featured in several songs: "Tollund Man" (1995) by the American folk band The Mountain Goats and "Curse of the Tollund Man" (2004) by the English rock band The Darkness.

Tollund Man was mentioned in the episode "Mummy in the Maze" of the American television series Bones and was also mentioned in the 2016 movie Sacrifice in which a bog body was found in the Shetland Islands.

He is also the subject of the modern novel Meet Me at the Museum, by Anne Youngson. One of the primary characters is a fictional curator at the Silkeborg Museum, who writes letters to an English woman, musing on the life and death of the Tollund Man.

Citations

General sources 
  Translated from the Danish original: Mosefolket: Jernalderens Mennesker bevaret i 2000 År, 1965.  The Wikipedia article: The Bog People.

Further reading

External links

 Tollund Man—A Face from Prehistoric Denmark
 Tollund Man at PBS
 
 The Tollund Man and The Tollund Man in Springtime by Seamus Heaney
 National Geographic September 2007: "Tales From the Bog"
 Image of the facial reconstruction to show what Tollund Man had looked when he was alive

5th-century BC births
5th-century BC deaths
5th-century BC people
1950 archaeological discoveries
1950 in Denmark
Archaeological discoveries in Denmark
Bog bodies
Germanic archaeological artifacts
May 1950 events in Europe
Pre-Roman Iron Age
Human sacrifice
Deaths by hanging